The 1911–12 Rugby Union County Championship was the 24th edition of England's premier rugby union club competition at the time.  

Devon won the competition for the sixth time defeating Northumberland in the final.

Semifinals

Final

See also
 English rugby union system
 Rugby union in England

References

Rugby Union County Championship
County Championship (rugby union) seasons